The R341 road is a regional road in Ireland. It is a loop road from the N59 road in County Galway. South of the R342, the road is part of the Wild Atlantic Way.

Route
The R341 travels south from the N59 passing Ballynahinch Castle and through the village of Roundstone. The road then travels west past Maumeen Lough before heading north to Ballyconneely. Finally the road reaches Clifden where it rejoins the N59. The inland side of the road is largely occupied by the Connemara Bog Complex Special Area of Conservation.

History
There are two significant historical sites by the R341. Further along the road, near Ballyconneely, is the site where Guglielmo Marconi established the first transatlantic telegraph service.

See also
Roads in Ireland

References

Regional roads in the Republic of Ireland
Roads in County Galway